Axis leaders met with each other and neutral representatives a number of times during World War II.

Gestapo–NKVD conferences
German–Soviet Axis talks
Montoire Conference
Greater East Asia Conference
Meeting at Hendaye
Salzburg Conference
Mogilev Conference
Wannsee Conference

See also 
 List of Allied World War II conferences

 
Conferences